Sweet of the Song is a 2016 Chinese romantic drama film directed by Ma Ning and starring Chai Hao, Lu Qianwen, Fan Jintao and Ma Guoxin. It was released in China by Beijing Honghe Pinshang Media on 18 December 2016.

Plot

Cast
Chai Hao
Lu Qianwen
Fan Jintao
Ma Guoxin

Reception
The film has grossed  in China.

References

Chinese romantic drama films
2016 romantic drama films
2010s Mandarin-language films